Hampsonodes is a genus of moths of the family Noctuidae.

Species
 Hampsonodes albiornis (Druce, 1908)
 Hampsonodes ampliplaga (Walker, 1858)
 Hampsonodes aperiens (Walker, 1857)
 Hampsonodes atrosignata (Zerny, 1916)
 Hampsonodes basicarnea (Walker, 1857)
 Hampsonodes bicornuta (Berio, 1966)
 Hampsonodes bilineata (Maassen, 1890)
 Hampsonodes comaltepeca (Berio, 1966)
 Hampsonodes confisa (Schaus, 1911)
 Hampsonodes dislocata (Walker, [1857])
 Hampsonodes divisa (Berio, 1966)
 Hampsonodes ferrealis (Hampson, 1918)
 Hampsonodes fuscoma (Schaus, 1906)
 Hampsonodes grandimacula (Guenée, 1852)
 Hampsonodes infirma (Schaus, 1894)
 Hampsonodes latifascia (Walker, 1865)
 Hampsonodes leucographa (Hampson, 1910)
 Hampsonodes leucopis (Hampson, 1918)
 Hampsonodes lilacina (E. D. Jones, 1914)
 Hampsonodes maneti (Schaus, 1912)
 Hampsonodes mastoides (Hampson, 1910)
 Hampsonodes melagona (Hampson, 1910)
 Hampsonodes mesochroa (Hampson, 1910)
 Hampsonodes naevia (Guenée, 1852)
 Hampsonodes obconica (Druce, 1908)
 Hampsonodes oliveata (Hampson, 1910)
 Hampsonodes orbica (Hampson, 1910)
 Hampsonodes parta (Schaus, 1894)
 Hampsonodes promentoria (Dognin, 1907)
 Hampsonodes pygmaea (Hampson, 1914)
 Hampsonodes retracta (Hampson, 1910)
 Hampsonodes rhodopis (Druce, 1908)
 Hampsonodes rufula (Dognin, 1907)
 Hampsonodes xanthea (E. D. Jones, 1908)

References
 
 

Hadeninae